Omaka Aerodrome  is a private airfield owned by the Marlborough Aero Club and used solely by private and vintage aircraft.

It is located two nautical miles to the Southwest of Blenheim, New Zealand, at the northern end of the South Island.

It houses the Omaka Aviation Heritage Centre, established in 2006, which displays many vintage aircraft.

Since 2001 the Classic Fighters biennial airshow has taken place at Omaka. It is held on the Easter weekend of odd-numbered years. each show is based on a different theme and typically includes mock air battles and other displays.

References

 New Zealand AIP 4 AD
New Zealand AIP (PDF)

Airports in New Zealand
Transport in the Marlborough Region
Transport buildings and structures in the Marlborough Region